Richard Harold Smith  (born 18 March 1944) is an Australian entrepreneur, aviator and philanthropist. He holds a number of aviation world records and is the founder of Dick Smith Electronics, Australian Geographic and Dick Smith Foods. He was selected as 1986 Australian of the Year. In 2010, he founded the media production company Smith&Nasht with the intention of producing films about global issues. In 2015, he was awarded the Companion of the Order of Australia. He is a fellow of the Committee for Skeptical Inquiry.

Early life

Smith's father was a salesman and sometime manager at Angus & Robertson's bookstore. He started a business that failed when Smith was 17, and his mother a housewife. His maternal grandfather was pictorialist photographer Harold Cazneaux.

As a child, Smith was considered academically hopeless and, having a speech defect, called himself "Dick Miff". From his home in East Roseville, Smith attended primary school at Roseville Public School at which, for the fifth grade, he ranked academically 45th in a class of 47. He attended North Sydney Technical High School. After three years of French, he managed only 7% in the Intermediate Certificate examination. He went on to complete his Leaving Certificate in 1961.

He joined the 1st East Roseville Scout Group as a Wolf Cub in 1952, aged 8 and later as a Boy Scout and Rover until 1967, earning the Baden-Powell Award in 1966.

Smith gained his amateur radio licence at the age of 16. He holds call sign VK2DIK. In his early 20s, Smith worked as a taxi radio repair technician for several years.

Aviation and adventures

Smith holds many world aviation records, made in rotary and fixed-wing aircraft and beneath balloons:  
 First solo trans-Atlantic flight by helicopter (1982)
 First solo circumnavigation by helicopter (1983)
 First helicopter to the North Pole (1987)
 First circumnavigation landing at both poles (1989)
 First non-stop balloon crossing of the Australian continent (1993)
 First east-west circumnavigation by helicopter (1995)
 First Trans-Tasman balloon flight (2001)

Smith's first significant adventure was in 1964 when he sailed with a group of Rover Scouts to Ball's Pyramid in the Pacific Ocean—the highest sea spire in the world. Failing to top it on this occasion, Smith returned in 1980, completed an ascent and, together with Hugh Ward and John Worrall, formally claimed the land for Australia by unfurling the New South Wales state flag. He went on, in 1988, to sue the state government over its ban on recreational climbing of the spire because the "restrictions really attack people's right to have an adventure". His action was taken when the government refused an application by Greg Mortimer, the first Australian to climb Mt Everest, to make the climb.

Smith learned to fly in 1972, graduating to a twin engine Beech Baron. In 1976, he competed in the Perth-to-Sydney air race.

Smith conceived and initiated airline flights over Antarctica. His first flight was made by a chartered Qantas aircraft on 13 February 1977. In August the same year, Smith chartered another jumbo, this time to take paying passengers on a 10-hour, 5,000 km flight over the Red Centre of the Outback in search of Lasseter's fabled but lost reef of gold. The search, attended by Lasseter's son Bob and Aboriginal tracker and artist Nosepeg Tjunkata Tjupurrula, found nothing.

At the age of 34, he purchased his first helicopter, a Bell Jetranger II, and, on 23 February 1979, obtained his licence to fly it. In January 1980, with Rick Howell co-piloting the Jetranger, he made a record-setting flight from Sydney to Lord Howe Island and returned (1,163 km). The helicopter opened new opportunities for exploring places otherwise inaccessible.

In 1982–83, Smith successfully completed the first solo helicopter flight around the world. His flight began in Fort Worth, Texas, on 5 August 1982, in a newly purchased Bell Jetranger 206B.

On 19 August, the 50th anniversary of James Mollison's solo crossing of the Atlantic, Smith completed the first solo Atlantic crossing in a helicopter when he arrived at Balmoral Castle, United Kingdom to be greeted by a waiting (then prince)  King Charles III. From there he flew to London, where, later that day, the first stage of his flight ended, after 11,752 km. The second stage of his flight started in London on 13 September and finished in Sydney, Australia, 3 October 1982, 23,092 km later. On 25 May 1983, the final stage of the flight started. Not being granted permission to land in the Soviet Union, he arranged to land on a ship to refuel. His journey ended on 22 July 1983, the 50th anniversary of Wiley Post's solo aeroplane flight around the world on 22 July 1933.

Smith made the first helicopter flight to the North Pole, upon his third attempt in his Jetranger helicopter. In 1986, he had to give up just 670 kilometres short of his destination because his navigation equipment was beginning to fail and visibility had dropped to almost zero. He failed once more, before his successful flight on 28 April 1987. The flight was made possible by having fuel delivered in a DHC-6 Twin Otter for refuelling in parts of the Arctic Circle.

In 1988–89, Smith flew a Twin Otter aircraft VH-SHW (registered after his hero, polar explorer Sir Hubert Wilkins) following meridians of longitude around the world, landing at both the North and South Poles, making him the first person to complete such a circumnavigation. The flight followed the "vertical" South-North-South track, (keeping broadly between 80 and 150 degrees E, heading south, and 60 and 100 degrees W, heading north) departing Sydney, Australia, on 1 November 1988, and returning on 28 May 1989. The journey included the first flight made from Australia to the Australian Antarctic Territory.

In August and again in October 1989, Smith, piloting his own helicopter, initiated and conducted searches in remote tracts of the Simpson Desert for the first stage of the Redstone Sparta rocket which had carried Australia's first satellite into orbit, making the nation only the fourth to succeed in doing so, on 29 November 1967. His search was ultimately successful, the relic recovered in an elaborate 22-person overland expedition the following year and placed on display in Woomera.

In October 1991, Smith was the second person to fly over Mount Everest. Dick and Pip Smith circled the summit in his Cessna Citation, taking photographs. In Australian Geographic (January–March 1993) Dick wrote: "The experience was unbelievable and I felt privileged to be one of the very few people to obtain permission from the Nepalese government to fly over the summit."

Smith and his co-pilot John Wallington made the first balloon trip across Australia, in a Cameron-R77 Rozière balloon, Australian Geographic Flyer, on 18 June 1993, for which he received the Commission Internationale d'Aerostation (FAI Ballooning Commission)'s 1995 Montgolfier Diploma.

In November of the same year, Smith broke the record for a purely solar-powered vehicular crossing of the Australian continent. The vehicle was equipped with 1,943 solar cells epoxied to its fibreglass shell, with lead-acid and lithium-thionol batteries for storage, producing a maximum of 1.4 kW. He achieved a 20-day reduction in the record previously set by Hans Tholstrup and Larry Perkins 12 years earlier in The Quiet Achiever.

In June 1995, Smith completed another helicopter flight around the world, this time with his wife Pip. He bought a twin-engine Sikorsky S-76. He said, "I hope that many of the areas will be photographed again in 10 years' time from exactly the same positions".

In November 1995, Smith climbed the most remote of the seven summits, Carstensz Pyramid in Irian Jaya with Peter Hillary and Greg Mortimer.

On 7 January 2006, Smith flew his Cessna Grand Caravan from Sydney to Hari Hari on the West Coast of New Zealand's South Island to mark the 75th anniversary of the first solo trans-Tasman flight by Guy Menzies in 1931.

Business ventures

Electronics

In 1968, with a A$610 investment by him and his then-fiancée Pip, Smith founded Dick Smith Car Radios, a small taxi radio repair business in the Sydney suburb of Neutral Bay, New South Wales, then later expanded into the car radio business at Gore Hill, naming himself the "Car-Radio 'Nut". This business later became electronics retailer Dick Smith Electronics which grew rapidly in the late 1970s, particularly through sales of Citizens Band radios and then personal computers, with annual sales of about A$17 million by 1978.

Smith took the business into Asia in 1978, opening a store in Ashley Road, Tsim Sha Tsui, Hong Kong's tourist shopping hub, and publishing an international catalogue edition until the store closed in 1980. That year, stores were also opened in Northern California and Los Angeles.

In 1980, he sold the business to Woolworths for A$25 million. Though Smith retained no shares nor role in the company after 1982, the business continued to trade with his name prominently displayed in every aspect of its operations. Sales reached A$1.4 billion in 2014, before a sharp decline and closure of its then hundreds of stores in Australia and New Zealand by May 2016.

Publishing and film

Australian Geographic

In 1986, Smith founded Australian Geographic Pty Ltd, which published the Australian Geographic magazine, a National Geographic-style magazine focusing on Australia. Smith did not want to greatly expand Australian Geographic, but his friend and CEO Ike Bain persuaded him to change his mind and soon it was a successful business. He sold the business to Fairfax Media in 1995 for A$41 million.

Film production
Smith co-produced the documentary First Contact, in 1983, recounting the discovery, in 1930, of a flourishing native population in the interior highlands of New Guinea. The film went on to win Best Feature Documentary at the 1983 Australian Film Institute Awards and was nominated for an Academy Award for Best Documentary Feature.

Australian products

Smith founded Dick Smith Foods in 1999, a crusade against foreign ownership of Australian food producers, particularly Arnott's Biscuits, which in 1997 became a wholly owned subsidiary of the Campbell Soup Company. Dick Smith Foods only sold foods produced in Australia by Australian-owned companies and all profits went to charity.

In 2018, Smith announced closure of the business in 2019, having distributed over A$10 million in profits to charity, citing aggressive competition from German-owned Aldi through a strategy including low-cost imports notwithstanding Aldi's claim to operate an Australian-first buying policy.

Aviation regulation reformist
Smith has been a vocal advocate for the civil aviation industry in Australia, having been appointed by Prime Minister Bob Hawke to be chairman of the Board of the Civil Aviation Authority (CAA) from February 1990 to February 1992. He also served as deputy-chairman and chairman of the Board of the Civil Aviation Safety Authority (CASA, the CAA's regulatory successor after the 1995 de-merger of the government's aviation operations including air traffic control) from 1997 until his resignation in 1999. During his CAA tenure, a comprehensive reform plan (including the Class G Demonstration airspace reform) was devised to improve safety, streamline bureaucracy and reduce costs but, facing opposition from the incumbent commercial operators, particularly Qantas and Ansett, it was never implemented. Smith claimed this was because there was resistance to increased competition in the market. Smith faced the same obstacles as head of CASA and left, concluding that his work there had failed.

Smith has campaigned ever since for the reining in of over-regulation of the industry, particularly of flight training operators where layers of compliance costs associated with instructor status, approvals to carry out training and aircraft airworthiness have been blamed for ultimately crippling the Australian aviation industry. In October 2015, he recommended a mass exit from the industry: "I absolutely recommend that people get out of aviation as quickly as they can, sell up their businesses and close down".

Stunts
Smith has also attempted a number of well-publicised practical jokes, including the April Fool's Day attempt to tow a purported iceberg from Antarctica into Sydney Harbour in 1978, a new source of fresh water. In the 1970s, Smith appeared on a pogo stick on various television programs, including Channel 9's Chris Kirby Show, as a promotional gimmick. In the early 1980s, Dick Smith organised the humorous promotional stunt in which a London double-decker bus jumped 16 motorcycles, an inversion of Evel Knievel's 1979 motorcycle jump over buses during an Australian visit. The bus was driven by adventurer Hans Tholstrup and Smith, who had been set up as its conductor, decided at the last minute to stay on board during the jump.

Writing
Smith's Our Fantastic Planet: Circling the Globe Via the Poles With Dick Smith, published in 1991, is his account of his Twin Otter circumnavigation. In his 1992 Solo Around the World, he writes of his round the world flight in his Jetranger helicopter and first successful helicopter flight to the North Pole. In 1997, Smith covered his latest helicopter circumnavigation of the world, this time east to west in a Sikorsky, in Above the World: A Pictorial Circumnavigation. In June 2011, his polemic challenging the "growth is good" principle, Dick Smith's Population Crisis: The Dangers of Unsustainable Growth for Australia was published. In December 2015, Smith's book, Balls Pyramid: Climbing the World's Tallest Sea Stack, a comprehensive and detailed history of climbs, including his own, on this remote and uniquely spectacular  volcanic remnant 20 km south-west of Lord Howe Island, was published.

Philanthropy
Beginning with his first charter in February 1977, Smith's Antarctic flights (operated by Qantas) had raised A$70,000 for charities including the Muscular Dystrophy Association, Foundation for National Parks & Wildlife (then of New South Wales) and Australian Museum over the following year. Many other charities followed Smith's lead in using Antarctic charters as a fundraising tool.

In 1985, Smith conceived, organised and led the first of what was to become a major annual motoring event, the B to B Bash, the proceeds of which go to Variety, the Children's Charity. Smith's Bourke to Burketown route through remote areas of the Outback raised A$250,000 while a total of over A$200 million has been raised for the charity by the event in the past 30 years.

In the 1980s, Smith gave millions to Life Education Centres which taught schoolchildren about the health effects of smoking, alcohol, and narcotics. In 1988, he published and distributed over 100,000 copies of Truth an Ad magazine delivering that message, and ran anti-tobacco industry ads in newspapers. He faulted tobacco and alcohol advertising for falsely linking them to youth, sophistication and success. Smith said at the time, "The most successful people, I find, generally don't drink. Now if you're constantly seeing ads showing the opposite, that's dishonest."

In 1987, Smith established the Australian Geographic Society Adventure Awards and is patron of the society. As its chairman, he initiated and led the restoration of polar adventurer Sir Hubert Wilkins' childhood home near Mt Bryan, South Australia, a nine-year project completed in 2001.

By 2005, Smith had made donations totalling at least A$15 million.

Smith was reported, in 2007, to have contributed A$1 million to charities in each of the 24 years since selling his electronics business and, in 2018, the Weekend Australian reported that Smith had continued to do so every year since.

In June 2010, Smith provided A$1 million to the Salvation Army for purchase of three houses for the homeless.

In April 2013, Smith donated A$1 million to the Australian Lions Foundation for their compassionate grants programme.

Through the Dick Smith Foods Foundation, A$1 million was donated to charities in 2014, in the Charity Breakthrough pledge.

Smith donated A$1 million to Rotary Australia World Community Service in his charitable distribution of the A$4,170,412 proceeds of sale of his Cessna Citation CJ3 jet in December 2016. Other substantial donations were made to The Scout Association of Australia, Wild Care Inc. of Tasmania and the Australian Indigenous Education Foundation, among numerous others. The construction of an orphanage and library at Onaba, in the Panjshir Valley, Afghanistan, was substantially funded by Smith.

In October 2017, Smith made a A$250,000 donation to the Namatjira Legacy Trust as part of a settlement negotiated by him for transfer from commercial interests of all copyright in the works of Albert Namatjira, to the benefit of Namatjira's descendants and the Aboriginal community at large. Namatjira was a leading Aboriginal artist of the 1950s and the first Australian Aboriginal to be granted citizenship.

In June 2018, Smith, on behalf of Dick Smith Foods, donated A$1 million to the Country Women's Association after a visit to the country town of Tooraweenah.

Smith has been consistently openly critical of tax evasion by the wealthy and their failure to be active in philanthropy, cajoling billionaires Rupert Murdoch and Harry Triguboff to do more.

Involvement in public affairs
In addition to his two terms of office heading the Australian Civil Aviation Authority (CAA) and Civil Aviation Safety Authority in the 1990s, Smith has engaged in a diverse range of civic activities.

Smith is a founder and a patron of the Australian Skeptics. In July 1980, Smith collaborated with renowned sceptic James Randi to test water divining, offering a prize of A$40,000 for a successful demonstration.

Within days of Australian Prime Minister Paul Keating's 1995 parliamentary announcement of his intention to make Australia a republic by 2001, public opinion was found to favour Smith as the nation's first president.

Then Prime Minister John Howard appointed Smith founding chairman of the National Council for the Centenary of Federation in December 1996 and he served till February 2000.

In 2005, Dick Smith gave public support to the asylum seeker Peter Qasim. Qasim was released later in 2005 by the Australian Government after seven years in detention. This support included the offer to visit India seeking evidence of Qasim's claims.

In June 2008, he offered a A$50,000 award for investigative journalism into the Government purchase of Super Seasprite helicopters, after the contract was cancelled at a cost of A$1.1 billion.

In response to a large increase in pertussis cases during a 2008–09 outbreak, Smith funded a national ad in The Australian encouraging parents to "Get The Facts" and derided the Australian Vaccination Network as an anti-vaccination organisation.

In November 2009, he paid a large share of the ransom to free Australian photojournalist Nigel Brennan and Canadian journalist Amanda Lindhout who were both being held hostage in Somalia.

In February 2012, Smith expressed himself skeptical of the purported Energy Catalyzer cold fusion device. On 14 February, he offered the inventor Andrea Rossi US$1 million if he were to repeat the demonstration of 29 March of the year before, this time allowing particular care to be given to a check of the electric wiring of the device, and to the power output. The offer was declined by Rossi before the lapse of 20 February acceptance deadline that had been set by Smith. Smith subsequently offered US$1 million "to any person or organisation that can come up with a practical device that has an output of at least one kilowatt of useful energy through LENRs (low energy nuclear reactions)." The offer remained open, unclaimed, until January 2013.

Political activism and conservation

In 1989, Smith offered an A$25,000 reward for discovery, dead or alive, of the elusive Australian night parrot. A dead specimen was found the next year by three ornithologists, associated with the Australian Museum, who claimed the prize and efforts to find living specimens were sparked. Eventually, in 2013, the first confirmed sighting in over a century was confirmed.

Smith donated A$60,000 in February 2007 towards a campaign to secure a fair trial for then Australian terrorism suspect David Hicks who had been held in a U.S. military prison in Cuba's Guantanamo Bay detention camp for five years. Smith said he wanted Hicks to get "a fair trial, a fair go". Fresh charges, including attempted murder, had been filed against Hicks earlier that month. Hicks pleaded guilty to a lesser charge in March 2007 as part of a plea bargain, and was released from custody in December 2007.

Smith, together with two others, offered to financially assist Australian Greens leader Bob Brown to satisfy a A$240,000 costs order after Brown lost an anti-logging case he brought against Forestry Tasmania. A failure to pay would have resulted in Brown having to declare bankruptcy, and therefore lose his seat in the Senate.

In 2011, Dick Smith expressed support for action on climate change, including the introduction of a carbon tax, and criticized the response to actor Cate Blanchett speaking out on the matter. He stated that "in their editorials (News Limited journalists) say they accept that human-induced climate change is a real danger ... yet their news pages and opinion pieces are full of endless attacks on politicians and others who support putting a price on carbon." In 2013, Smith released a documentary, Ten Bucks a Litre, profiling Australia's current energy sources and future options. Narrated by Smith and featuring him at spectacular mining and power generation locations across the country and abroad, the documentary called for urgent action to replace fossil fuels with renewables and concluded that nuclear would be the only solution if energy consumption did not go down. Smith explained his positive position on nuclear power generation in a 21 July 2017 interview with former Labor Party leader Mark Latham, citing France as having been particularly successful, but conceded that public opinion in Australia had been so tainted and was so irrational that there was little prospect of a plant ever being built there.

Aboriginal reconciliation
As chairman of the National Centenary of Federation Council (1996–2000), an appointment made by then Prime Minister John Howard, Smith advocated renaming 26 January, Australia Day (which commemorates the arrival of the first fleet of British settlers in 1788), as "First Fleet Day" in recognition of the fact it was not a day for celebration by all Australians.

Population policy activism 
In August 2010, Smith announced he would be devoting himself to questions of global population, overpopulation, and alternatives to an endless economic growth economy. He produced and appeared in the feature-length documentary Dick Smith's Population Puzzle broadcast by public network the Australian Broadcasting Corporation, questioning the desirability of Australia's rapid population growth. In the documentary, Smith called the campaign the most important thing he had ever done in his life. It was subsequently distributed on DVD. The same year, he established the production company Smith&Nasht with producer Simon Nasht.

In August 2010, he announced the Wilberforce Award of A$1 million to any person under 30 who could attract his attention by advocating alternatives to population and consumption growth.

In May 2011, Dick Smith published his book on the subject, Dick Smith's Population Crisis: The Dangers of Unsustainable Growth for Australia. In 2013, Smith&Nasht revisited the topic of overpopulation with the release of an hour-long documentary film called The Vasectomist.

On 6 December 2016, Smith spoke in support of the One Nation party's policy of reducing immigration to historical levels of about 70,000 per annum whilst at the same time rejecting its leader Pauline Hanson's call for a Muslim ban. Smith described himself as pro-immigration but cautioned that the very high rates of immigration which began under Prime Minister John Howard would increase population beyond carrying capacity, causing high rates of unemployment and even greater wealth disparity, leading to discontent and, ultimately, violence.

In September 2017, Smith was reported to have joined the Sustainable Australia party.

The Dick Smith Party 
In March 2015, the media announced that Dick Smith had registered The Dick Smith Party, but would not be running as a candidate himself. The party stated it intended to focus on the Senate and would run on a platform of curbing unnecessary regulation and population growth. Smith is opposed to Australia's "ridiculously huge" rates of immigration on grounds of environmental sustainability.

Dick Smith Fair Go
On 15 August 2017, Smith launched his "Fair Go" campaign to pressure Australia's major political parties to incorporate population policy into their platforms and to radically increase taxation on the rich and corporates. His plan included tax increases for the wealthiest 1% and that the Norwegian model of publishing lists of top taxpayers be adopted. He was reported to have spent A$1 million on promoting the campaign through television advertising, including commissioning a commercial that invoked the 1987 Grim Reaper AIDS awareness campaign.  He also pledged to spend another A$2 million on promoting population policy at the next Federal election if no major party would commit to reducing immigration to 70,000 per annum from a level then averaging in excess of 200,000. The Fair Go Campaign called for a more than 50% increase in places for refugees in the annual immigration quota. The campaign quickly matured into a permanent presence as the Dick Smith Fair Go Group which also agitates for economic reforms to tackle income inequality and a return to affordable housing.

Smith criticised the Liberal Party government's policy of paying beneficiaries of self-managed superannuation funds rebates for franking credits created upon payment of profits tax by the underlying investee corporations. He expressed horror when receiving A$500,000 from the government and called for the scheme to be reformed to stop "outrageous" payouts to the wealthy. The tax commissioner remarked that never before had someone asked him if they could pay more tax.

Awards and honours
Smith was awarded the Baden-Powell Award in 1966, the highest award in the Rover Section, after 14 years in the Scouting movement.

In 1983, Smith was the UK's Honourable Company of Air Pilots Sword of Honour recipient for his "outstanding contribution to General Aviation". The same year, he received the Oswald Watt Gold Medal for "a most brilliant performance in the air by an Australian", conferred by the Royal Federation of Aero Clubs of Australia.

Smith was awarded Australian of the Year in 1986. At Smith's Australian of the Year Presentation he suggested that publisher Rupert Murdoch might like to take a year off, come back to Australia and share some of his expertise by heading the Treasury or the Reserve Bank.

In 1992, Smith received the United States' Lindbergh award. The Award, "is given annually to individuals whose work over many years has made significant contributions toward the Lindbergh's concept of balancing technology and nature."

Smith was named an Australian Living Treasure in 1997.

Smith was appointed an Officer of the Order of Australia in the Australia Day Honours of 1999, for his services to the community, charity and business.

In 2000, Smith was named the 2000 Adventurer of the Year by the Australian Geographic Society, after he made a trans-Tasman balloon trip from New Zealand to Australia.

The Australian Government honoured Smith with the Centenary Medal in 2001 for "service to the Centenary of Federation celebrations".

The Bulletin magazine, then Australia's longest running, named Smith on its 2006 list of 100 Most Influential Australians, with Rupert Murdoch, Shane Warne, Peter Weir, William Wentworth, Patrick White and Gough Whitlam.

The Explorers Club, of which he is an International Fellow, awarded Smith the Lowell Thomas Award in 2008 for outstanding exploration, themed that year "Exploring Earth From Above". He was one of six awardees including legendary aviator Chuck Yeager.

In 2010, Smith was the patron for the 100th anniversary of the Wireless Institute of Australia, including being the major speaker at the annual general meeting in Canberra on 27 May 2010. The next day, he hosted AGM attendees at his country property, "Bowylie", near Gundaroo, New South Wales,
formerly the home of actress Maud Jeffries.

On 29 June 2010 Smith accepted the commission of rear admiral of the Lake Eyre Yacht Club.

In December 2011, Smith was appointed as a consulting professor in the Department of Biology, School of Humanities and Sciences of Stanford University, California, by Dean Richard P. Saller. This was made in recognition of his many years of work in relation to environmental issues including his 2011 book, Dick Smith's Population Crisis.

In May 2013, a newly identified 20-million-year-old koala relative was named Litokoala dicksmithi in honour of Smith. Lead author of the research paper, Karen Black, explained she chose to recognise Smith "for his long-term financial support of Australian scientific endeavour and in particular fossil research at Riversleigh."

On 16 November 2013, Dick Smith was inducted into the Australian Aviation Hall of Fame.

In October 2014, Dick Smith received a Special Australian Geographic Society Award for 50 years of adventure.

In 2015, Smith was advanced to a Companion of the Order of Australia, the nation's highest order of chivalry, "for eminent service to the community as a benefactor of a range of not-for-profit and conservation organisations, through support for major fundraising initiatives for humanitarian and social welfare programs, to medical research and the visual arts, and to aviation."

In September 2018, Smith was named Australian Father of the Year by the Australia Fathers Day Council in conjunction with the Shepherd Centre.

References

Further reading
Davis, Pedr. Kookaburra: The Most Compelling Story in Australia's Aviation History, Lansdowne books, Dee Why, 1980, 
Smith, Dick. The Earth Beneath Me: Dick Smith's Epic Journey Across the World, Angus & Robertson London 1983, 
Smith, Dick. Our Fantastic Planet: Circling the Globe Via the Poles With Dick Smith, Terry Hills N.S.W. Australian Geographic, 1991, 
Smith, Dick. Solo Around the World, Australian Geographic, Terrey Hills, 1992, 
Gott, Robert. Makers and Shakers, Reed Educational & Professional Publishing, Melbourne, 1998, 
Smith, Dick and Pip. Above the World: A Pictorial Circumnavigation, Australian Geographic, Terrey Hills, 1996, 
Bain, Ike. The Dick Smith Way, McGraw-Hill, Sydney, 2002, 
Smith, Dick. Dick Smith's Population Crisis: The Dangers of Unsustainable Growth of Australia, Allen & Unwin, Sydney, 2011 

Smith, Dick (November 2021). "My Adventurous Life".  Allen & Unwin ISBN 978-1-76087-889-4. (Australian Book Industry Awards "2022 Biography Book of the Year").

External links

 Dick Smith's Adventures, Smith's own catalogue of exploits

1944 births
Australian aviators
Australian autobiographers
Australian businesspeople in retailing
Living people
People from the North Shore, Sydney
Amateur radio people
Companions of the Order of Australia
Australian of the Year Award winners
Australian philanthropists
Australian company founders
Australian film studio executives
Businesspeople from Sydney
Rotorcraft flight record holders
Balloon flight record holders
Australian aviation record holders
Australian Geographic people
Australian sceptics
Recipients of the Centenary Medal
Australian republicans